This is a list of German football transfers in the summer transfer window 2014 by club. Only transfers of the Bundesliga, and 2. Bundesliga are included.

Bundesliga

Bayern Munich

In:

Out:

Note: Flags indicate national team as has been defined under FIFA eligibility rules. Players may hold more than one non-FIFA nationality.

Borussia Dortmund

In:

Out:

FC Schalke 04

In:

Out:

Bayer 04 Leverkusen

In:

Out:

VfL Wolfsburg

In:

Out:

Borussia Mönchengladbach

In:

Out:

1. FSV Mainz 05

In:

Out:

FC Augsburg

In:

Out:

1899 Hoffenheim

In:

Out:

Hannover 96

In:

Out:

Hertha BSC

In:

Out:

Werder Bremen

In:

Out:

Eintracht Frankfurt

In:

Out:

SC Freiburg

In:

Out:

VfB Stuttgart

In:

Out:

Hamburger SV

In:

Out:

1. FC Köln

In:

Out:

SC Paderborn 07

In:

Out:

2. Bundesliga

1. FC Nürnberg

In:

Out:

Eintracht Braunschweig

In:

Out:

SpVgg Greuther Fürth

In:

Out:

1. FC Kaiserslautern

In:

Out:

.

Karlsruher SC

In:

Out:

Fortuna Düsseldorf

In:

Out:

1860 Munich

In:

Out:

FC St. Pauli

In:

Out:

1. FC Union Berlin

In:

Out:

FC Ingolstadt 04

In:

Out:

VfR Aalen

In:

Out:

SV Sandhausen

In:

Out:

FSV Frankfurt

In:

Out:

FC Erzgebirge Aue

In:

Out:

VfL Bochum

In:

Out:

1. FC Heidenheim

In:

Out:

RB Leipzig

In:

Out:

SV Darmstadt 98

In:

Out:

See also
 2014–15 Bundesliga
 2014–15 2. Bundesliga

References

External links
 Official site of the DFB 
 Kicker.de 
 Official site of the Bundesliga 
 Official site of the Bundesliga

Football transfers summer 2014
Trans
2014